The 2007 Mojo honours list winners were announced at a ceremony at The Brewery in London, England on 18 June 2007.

Nominees
Complete list of nominees (winners in bold):

Album of the Year
Amy Winehouse - Back to Black
Bob Dylan - Modern Times
The Good, the Bad & the Queen - The Good, the Bad & the Queen
Grinderman - Grinderman
Midlake - The Trials of Van Occupanther
Song of the Year
Amy Winehouse - "Rehab"
Arctic Monkeys - "Brianstorm"
The Gossip - "Standing in the Way of Control"
Guillemots - "Made-Up Lovesong 43"
The View - "Same Jeans"
Best Live Act
Amy Winehouse
Arcade Fire
Arctic Monkeys 
The Stooges
The Who
Breakthrough Act
The Hold Steady
Joanna Newsom
Midlake
Seasick Steve
The View
Catalogue Release
Gram Parsons - The Complete Reprise Sessions
Fairport Convention - Live at the BBC 
Various - Forever Changing: The Golden Age of Elektra Records 1963-1973
Johnny Cash - At San Quentin
Karen Dalton - In My Own Time 
Various - The Complete Motown Singles Vol 6. 1966
Classic Album Award: 
Exodus by Bob MarleyCompilation of the Year
Change is Gonna Come: The Voice of Black America 1963-1973 
Jonny Greenwood is the Controller 
Rough Trade Shops: Counterculture 1976 
Soul Gospel Volume 2 White Bicycles: Making Music in the 1960s - The Joe Boyd Story
Vision Award
Nirvana - Live! Tonight! Sold Out!! 
Slade - Slade in Flame
Ronnie Lane - The Passing Show - The Life And Music of Ronnie Lane 
Gorillaz - Phase Two: Slowboat to Hades
T. Rex - T. Rex On TV
Townes Van Zandt - Be Here to Love Me
Cult Hero
The Only Ones
Hall of Fame Award
The Doors
Hero Award
Alice Cooper
Icon Award
Ozzy Osbourne
Innovation in Sound Award
Suicide
Inspiration Award
Björk
Legend Award
Ike Turner
Les Paul Award
Peter Green
Lifetime Achievement Award
The Stooges
Maverick Award
Echo & the Bunnymen
The Mojo Medal
Jac Holzman of Elektra Records
Outstanding Contribution
Joy Division

References

External links
Mojo magazine

Mojo
British music awards
2007 awards in the United Kingdom
2007 in London
Mojo